Ove André Vanebo (born 2 May 1983) is a Norwegian politician for the Progress Party.

From 2008 to 2012 he was the chairman of the Youth of the Progress Party, the youth wing of the Progress Party.

He served as a deputy representative to the Norwegian Parliament from Buskerud during the term 2005–2009. On the local level Vanebo is a member of Øvre Eiker municipality council and Buskerud county council since 2003.

References

1983 births
Living people
Deputy members of the Storting
Progress Party (Norway) politicians
Buskerud politicians
21st-century Norwegian politicians